Seyochung is a settlement in Kiphire district of Nagaland state of India.

Population 
According to the 2011 Census of India, there were two parts of Seyochung. Seyochung Hq had a population of 840, while Seyochung Village had a population of 1,457 people.

References

Villages in Kiphire district